Rina Foygel Barber (known until 2012 as Rina Foygel) is an American statistician whose research includes works on the Bayesian statistics of graphical models, false discovery rates, and regularization. She is the Louis Block Professor of statistics at the University of Chicago.

Barber taught mathematics at the Park School of Baltimore from 2005 to 2007. She completed her Ph.D. at the University of Chicago in 2012. Her dissertation, Prediction and model selection for high-dimensional data with sparse or low-rank structure, was jointly supervised by Mathias Drton and Nathan Srebro. After postdoctoral research at Stanford University with Emmanuel Candès, she returned to the University of Chicago as a faculty member.

She won a Sloan Research Fellowship in 2016. In 2017 the Institute of Mathematical Statistics gave her their Tweedie New Researcher Award "for groundbreaking contributions in high-dimensional statistics, including the identifiability of graphical models, low-rank matrix estimation, and false discovery rate theory ... [and] development of the knockoff filter for controlled variable selection".

References

External links

Home page

Year of birth missing (living people)
Living people
American statisticians
Women statisticians
University of Chicago alumni
University of Chicago faculty
Sloan Research Fellows
Park School of Baltimore alumni